This is a list of wars involving the Republic of South Ossetia.

References

South Ossetia
Wars